Wand sage is a common name for several plants and may refer to:

Salvia vaseyi, native to the Colorado Desert of North America
Salvia virgata, native to Asia and southeastern Europe